Malsachanus (fl. 8th or 9th century) was an Irish Latin writer.

Overview

Very little appears to be known of Malsachanus. Cambridge lists Ars Malsachani. Ed M. Roger. Traitè du verbe publiè d'après le ms lat. 13026 de lat Bibliothèque nationale, Paris 1905.

External links
 The New Cambridge Bibliography of English Literature , by George Watson.

Irish writers
8th-century Irish writers
9th-century Irish writers
8th-century Latin writers
9th-century Latin writers